The 2017 Edinboro Fighting Scots football team represented the Edinboro University of Pennsylvania in the 2017 NCAA Division II football season. They competed in the Pennsylvania State Athletic Conference (PSAC) West Division.

Schedule

References

Edinboro
Edinboro Fighting Scots football
Edinboro Fighting Scots football